"I Know (You Don't Love Me No More)" is an R&B song written and recorded by American singer Barbara George, released as her debut single in 1961. It became her signature song and her only major hit in United States, reaching number-one on the Billboard R&B singles chart and #3 in the Hot 100. The song was later covered by various artists, inducing Fats Domino, Cher, Ike & Tina Turner, and Bonnie Raitt. A Spanish version by Marisela topped Billboard's Latin chart in 1988. The Shirelles borrowed the melody of "I Know" for their 1963 cover of "Everybody Loves A Lover".

Background
Barbara George began singing as a teen in her Baptist church choir and writing her own original songs. Already married by age 16, she later befriended R&B performer Jessie Hill, who wrangled her an audition with saxophonist/arranger Harold Battiste's fledgling AFO label. In June 1961, Battiste organized a split recording session for George and fellow AFO artist Prince La La at producer Cosimo Matassa's J&M Studios. Backed by New Orleans studio performers including cornetist Melvin Lastie, guitarist Roy Montrell, and drummer John Boudreaux, George cut the self-penned "I Know (You Don't Love Me No More)", a vibrant, up-tempo number inspired by the traditional hymn "Just a Closer Walk with Thee". Issued via AFO's national distribution deal with Juggy Murray's Sue Records, "I Know" hit radio and retail in late 1961 and was a national 'crossover' hit, topping the U.S. R&B charts and crossing over to #3 on Billboard'''s pop chart.

Marisela version
In 1988, American singer Marisela recorded a cover version of the song for the soundtrack of the film Salsa. The original version recorded by Marisela was sung in English language and included on the film soundtrack, along with songs by Laura Branigan, Tito Puente, Robi Rosa, Wilkins and Grupo Niche. A Spanish language version of the track, produced by Enrique Elizondo, was later included in Marisela's album of the same title, under the title "Ya No". This version became her first number-one single in the Billboard Hot Latin Tracks chart, temporarily dislodging Franco's "María" for one week from the top of the chart.

 Other versions 

 1962: Bobby Rydell released a version on his album All the Hits 1963: Beryl Marsden's single
 1965: Paul Revere & The Raiders on the album Just Like Us! 1965: Pat Carroll on the album Requests! 1965: Tina Turner & Vanetta Fields performed a live version which was released on the album Live! The Ike & Tina Turner Show 1966: Fontella Bass released a version on her album The 'New' Look
 1968: Fats Domino's version reached #14 on the Billboard R&B chart
 1969: Ike & Tina Turner's version's from their album The Hunter reached #126 on Billboard's Bubbling Under The Hot 100
 1972: Bonnie Raitt released a rendition on her album Give It Up
 1972: Rufus Thomas released a version on his album Crown Prince of Dance 1973: Anne Murray released a version on her album Danny's Song 1974: The Newbeats released a rendition as a single
 1975: Yvonne Fair released a version on her album The Bitch Is Black 1976: Cher released a version on her album I'd Rather Believe in You 1978: Joe Cocker released a version on his album Luxury You Can Afford 2000: B.B. King released a rendition on his album Makin' Love Is Good for You''

See also
List of number-one R&B singles of 1962 (U.S.)
List of number-one Billboard Top Latin Songs from the 1980s

References

1961 songs
1961 debut singles
1962 singles
1974 singles
1988 singles
Barbara George songs
Fats Domino songs
The Newbeats songs
Ike & Tina Turner songs
Marisela songs